HD 81101 is a single star in the southern constellation of Carina. It has the Bayer designation k Carinae, while HD 81101 is the star's designation in the Henry Draper catalogue. The star has a yellow hue and is faintly visible to the naked eye with an apparent visual magnitude of 4.79. It is located at a distance of approximately 225 light years from the Sun based on parallax. This object is drifting further away with a radial velocity of +51 km/s, having come to within  of the Sun some 1.4 million years ago.

This is an aging giant star with a stellar classification of G6III, having exhausted the supply of hydrogen at its core then cooled and expanded away from the main sequence. It is two billion years old with 1.95 times the mass of the Sun and has expanded to 11 times the Sun's radius. The star is radiating 65 times the luminosity of the Sun from its swollen photosphere at an effective temperature of 4,908 K. Being a member of the old disk population, the metallicity of the star's stellar atmosphere is much lower than solar.

References 

G-type giants
Carina (constellation)
Carinae, k
Durchmusterung objects
081101
045856
3728